Saumarez is a civil parish in Gloucester County, New Brunswick, Canada.

For governance purposes, the entire parish is within the regional municipality of Tracadie. Before the formation of the regional municipality in 2014, Saumarez Parish included one town and twelve local service districts, with an additional special service area within the parish LSD.

Tracadie is a member of the Acadian Peninsula Regional Service Commission (APRSC).

Origin of name
The parish was named in honour of Sir Thomas Saumarez, acting Governor of New Brunswick when it was erected. Six of the parishes erected simultaneously in Northumberland County in 1814 were named for prominent British military figures.

History
Saumarez was erected in 1814 as part of Northumberland County from unassigned territory. It included all modern Gloucester County except Beresford Parish.

In 1827, all of the parish west of Teague's Brook was erected as Bathurst Parish.

In 1831, Caraquet and New Bandon were erected as their own parishes.

In 1855, Inkerman was erected from the northern part of Saumarez. The barrier islands east of Tracadie Bay were included in Inkerman.

In 1870 the barrier islands south of the Old Tracadie Gully were returned to Saumarez.

In 1881 a large area along the northwestern boundary was included in the newly erected Saint-Isidore Parish.

In 1947 the western end of Saumarez was included in the newly erected Allardville.

Boundaries
Saumarez Parish is bounded:

on the east by LeBouthillier Brook, the Old Tracadie Gully, and the Gulf of Saint Lawrence;
on the south by the Northumberland County line;
on the west by the western line of timber block 4 in Ranges 8, 9, 10, the southernmost corner of Range 10 being downstream of the mouth of Bear Brook and upstream of the mouth of Big Hole Brook;
on the north by the prolongation of the southern line of Range 9 in the Saint Isidore Settlement, which runs along the south side of Rang 9 Road, northeasterly to the Little Tracadie River, then downstream until it strikes Range 9 again, then northeasterly along Range 9 to its easternmost corner, then northwesterly along the eastern line of Ranges 9, 8 (partly along Alderwood Road), and 7 to the rear line of Range 6 of Saint Isidore, which runs along the south side of Route 160, then northeasterly along Range 6 to its easternmost corner, then northwesterly to the sharp bend of Boishébert Road, then northeasterly along grant lines to Gaspereau Creek, then upstream two grants to the southern line of Route 160 and the W. Gautreau Road, then northeasterly to the Saint-Raymond Road, then northwesterly across two grants to the northern line of the second grant, then northeasterly along the grant line and its prolongation to where Route 11 crosses LeBouthillier Brook.

Communities
Communities at least partly within the parish. italics indicate a name no longer in official use

  Alderwood
 Benoit
  Gauvreau
 Leech
 Little Gaspereau
 Little Tracadie
  Losier Settlement
  Pointe-à-Bouleau
  Pont-Lafrance
  Pont-Landry
 Rivière-à-la-Truite (Trout Stream)
  Saint-Irénée
 Saint-Pons
  Saumarez
 Tracadie Beach 
 Tracadie-Sheila
  Upper Sheila
  Val-Comeau

Bodies of water
Bodies of water at least partly within the parish.

 Rivière à Comeau
 Big Tracadie River
 Leech River
 Little Tracadie River
 Tabusintac River
 Odilon Stream
 Trout Stream
 Gulf of St. Lawrence
 Tracadie Bay
 Big Tracadie River Gully
 Old Tracadie Gully
 Tracadie Gully
 The Lake

Conservation areas
Parks, historic sites, and related entities at least partly within the parish.
 Val-Comeau Provincial Park

Demographics

Population

Language

See also
List of parishes in New Brunswick

Notes

References

Neighbourhoods in Grand Tracadie-Sheila
Former parishes of New Brunswick